Phacelia egena is a species of phacelia known by the common name Kaweah River phacelia. It is native to much of California, from the Transverse Ranges to the northern mountains and into Oregon; it also occurs in Arizona. It grows in many types of habitat.

Description 
Phacelia egena is a herb producing a hairy, erect stem up to about 60 centimeters in maximum height. Most of the lance-shaped leaves are located low on stem, the largest over 20 centimeters long and divided into many leaflets. Leaves higher on the stem are much smaller and undivided.

The inflorescence is a one-sided curving or coiling cyme of several bell-shaped flowers. The flower is just under a centimeter long and is white to cream in color with five protruding white stamens.

External links
Phacelia egena. Jepson eFlora.
CalPhotos.

egena
Flora of California
Flora of Arizona
Flora of Oregon
Flora of the Cascade Range
Flora of the Great Basin
Flora of the Klamath Mountains
Flora of the Sierra Nevada (United States)
Natural history of the California chaparral and woodlands
Natural history of the California Coast Ranges
Natural history of the Central Valley (California)
Natural history of the San Francisco Bay Area
Natural history of the Santa Monica Mountains
Natural history of the Transverse Ranges
Flora without expected TNC conservation status